Mount Sirius is a peak, 2,300 m, surmounting a prominent, wedge-shaped, ice-free spur between Walcott Neve and Bowden Neve, 3.5 nautical miles (6 km) north of Bauhs Nunatak. Named by the New Zealand Geological Survey Antarctic Expedition (NZGSAE) (1961–62) for the star Sirius which was used in fixing the baseline in the area.

Mountains of the Ross Dependency
Shackleton Coast